Longview or Long view may refer to:

Places

Canada
Longview, Alberta, a village
Longview, British Columbia, a former cannery town
Longview Range, British Columbia; a mountain range

United Kingdom

England
Longview Psychiatric Unit, a hospital in Colchester
Longview, an area of Huyton, Merseyside

United States

 Longview Army Airfield, Adak, Adak Island, Aleutian Islands, Alaska
 Long View High School, Lakewood, Colorado
 Longview, Illinois, a village in Champaign County
 Longview (Georgetown, Kentucky), listed on the NRHP in Scott County, Kentucky
 Longview, Louisville, a neighborhood of Louisville, Kentucky
 Longview (Gardner, Louisiana), an historic mansion
 Longview (Lutcher, Louisiana), listed on the NRHP in St. James Parish, Louisiana
 Longview, Mississippi, an unincorporated community in Oktibbeha County
 Longview, Missouri, an unincorporated community in McDonald County
 Longview Farm, Lee's Summit, Missouri; a farm
 Longview Lake, a reservoir in Jackson County, Missouri
 Long View Island, Thousand Islands, Saint-Lawrence River, New York State
 Longview School, Brewster, New York State
 Long View, North Carolina, a town in Burke and Catawba counties
 Long View Center, Raleigh, North Carolina; a historic church
 Longview Ranch Airport, Wheeler County, Oregon
 Longview (Nashville, Tennessee), an historic mansion
 Longview, Texas, a city in Gregg and Harrison counties
 Longview metropolitan area, Texas
 Longview Independent School District
 Longview station, an Amtrak station
 Longview High School
 Longview Mall
 Longview, Washington, a city in Cowlitz County
 Port of Longview, Washington; a seaport
 Longview Bridge
 Longview Public Schools, a school district
 Longview Rail Yard (LVSW, aka, Longview Switching); see List of rail yards
 Longview, Benton County, Washington, an unincorporated community
 Longview, West Virginia, an unincorporated community in Barbour County
 Longview Power Plant, Maidsville, West Virginia
 Longview Formation, Virginia; a geologic formation

Music
Longview (American band), an American bluegrass band
Longview (British band), a British indie rock band
"Longview" (song), by the band Green Day

Groups, companies, organizations
Longview Aviation Capital, a Canadian aviation holding company
Longview Solutions, a BPM software company
LongView Technologies, a software company
Longview Switching, a rail subsidiary of BNSF; see List of common carrier freight railroads in the United States

Other
The Long View, a BBC history TV show
Operation Longview (1942), a WWII landing operation at Amchitka during the Aleutian Islands campaign
Longview (Transformers), several fictional characters
 Long View of London from Bankside, a panoramic etching made by Wenceslas Hollar in 1647
 , U.S. Navy Longview-class missile instrumentation ship
 Longview-class missile range instrumentation ship; see

See also

 Kelso-Longview Airport, Washington state, USA
 Longview–Marshall combined statistical area, Texas, USA
 Long View Farm, North Brookfield, Massachusetts, USA; a recording studio
 Longview race riot (1919), Longview, Texas, USA
 
 
 Longview Airport (disambiguation)
 Longview School District (disambiguation)
 Longue Vue (disambiguation)